Archidendron microcarpum (In Indonesian: kabau or jolang-jaling) is a plant, native to the wild forests of Sumatra. It produces fruit, oval in shape and green with darker skin. The plant is notably potent. Typically, these plants live in the tropics, and includes plants that grow wild in the forests of Sumatra. This fruit smells like jering and banana.  The trait makes kabau similar to them and thus it is consumed like both of the plants.

According to the Indonesian dictionary, kabau is a bad smelling fruit that can be consumed.

In the area of Rejang, kabau consumed as fresh vegetables and is usually consumed with rice that bergulai entry, tempoyak, or side dishes typical of other Sumatra. Based on existing experience, kabau have substances such as chalk owned Jering. This could lead to the head, which is characterized by hard fruit urine and the presence of substances such as chalk is out along with the urine.

References

microcarpum
Flora of Sumatra